Sergei Golovin was an actor. Honored Artist of the RSFSR.

Selected filmography 
 1916 — Miss Peasant
 1919 — Polikushka
 1920 — Andzhelo

References

External links 
 Сергей Головин on kino-teatr.ru

Male actors from the Russian Empire
Soviet male actors
1879 births
1941 deaths